Petr Pála and David Rikl were the defending champions and won in the final 7–5, 6–4 against Mike Bryan and Michael Hill.

Seeds
Champion seeds are indicated in bold text while text in italics indicates the round in which those seeds were eliminated.

  Petr Pála /  David Rikl (champions)
  Mike Bryan /  Michael Hill (final)
  Simon Aspelin /  Andrew Kratzmann (semifinals)
  David Adams /  Andrei Olhovskiy (quarterfinals)

Draw

External links
 2002 International Raiffeisen Grand Prix Doubles Draw

Hypo Group Tennis International
2002 ATP Tour